Tischer is a German surname. Notable people with the surname include:

  (born 1981), German politician
 Józef Tischner (1931–2000), Polish priest and philosopher
 Rudolf Tischner (1879–1961), German ophthalmologist and parapsychologist

See also
Tischer

German-language surnames